AMWS may refer to:
American Men and Women of Science, biographical dictionary
Army Mountain Warfare School, United States Army school at Fort Benning, Vermont, United States